Distinctive Records (formerly Distinct'ive Records) is a UK based record label founded in 1995. The label has hundreds of releases from artists, most notably Hybrid, Way Out West, and Ils.

History
Distinctive Records was initially founded in 1995 and started out as a sublabel of Avex Recordings (UK). In 1998, Avex reorganized, closed two of its labels and only continued trading music recordings as Distinct'ive Records. In 1999, The company began categorizing its genres within the label, sometimes retitling itself "Distinct'ive Breaks", which was often mistaken to be a sublabel of Distinct'ive.

The label gained popularity in 2000 at the launch of its own "Y3K" series.

Y3K series
 Y3K: Deep Progressive Breaks
 Y3K: Soundtrack to the Future

Y4K series
 Y4K: Tayo/Further Still
 Koma & Bones Present: Y4K
 Freq Nasty Presents: Y4K: Next Level Breaks
 Dub Pistols Present: Y4K
 Tayo Presents: Y4K
 ILS Presents: Y4K
 Y4K: Past Lessons, Future Theories
 Überzone Presents: Y4K
 Hybrid Present: Y4K
 Soul of Man Presents: Y4K: Breakin' in Tha House
 Phil K Presents: Y4K
 Ali B Presents: Y4K
 Evil Nine Present: Y4K
 Nubreed Present: Y4K
 DJ Icey Presents: Y4K
 Trouble Soup Present: Y4K
 Annie Nightingale Presents: Y4K
 General Midi Presents: Y4K
 Distinctive Presents: Y4K: The 20th

Artists
 Adam Fielding
 Boom Jinx
 Chris Coco
 DJ Hyper
 Dub Pistols
 General Midi
 Hexadecimal
 Hybrid
 ILL Audio
 Ils
 John Graham
 Way Out West

See also
 List of record labels

References

External links
Distinct'ive Records Official Website

Resident Advisor
Hybrid's website

British record labels
Electronic music record labels